The siege of Ulsan was an unsuccessful Ming-Joseon attempt to capture Ulsan from the Japanese. The siege lasted from 26 January to 19 February 1598.

Background
Yang Hao, Ma Gui, and Gwon Yul met up at Gyeongju on the 26 January 1598 and marched on Ulsan with an army of 50,000.

Battle
The allied army reached Ulsan on 29 January.

The battle began with a false retreat that lured the Japanese garrison into a frontal attack. They were defeated with 500 losses and were forced to retreat to Tosan fortress. The allies occupied the city of Ulsan.

On 30 January the allies bombarded the fortress and then took the outer wall of Tosan. The Japanese abandoned much of their food supplies and retreated into the inner fortress. The allies assaulted the inner fortress, at one point even taking a portion of the wall, but suffered heavy casualties. Their cannons were of no help since the fortress was situated too high to reach. Eventually the attack was called off, and a long siege began.

On 19 February the allied forces attacked again and were repelled. Seeing Japanese reinforcements arrive, Yang Hao decided to lift the siege and retreat, but the disorganized movement led to many stragglers being cut down by the Japanese, leading to heavy casualties.

Aftermath
Joseon and Ming forces losses according to Ming sources numbered 798 killed at the battle and a further 823 dead by injuries for a total of 1,621 dead. The wounded reached 2,908. Other sources like Hawley put the number of Joseon and Ming losses ranging from 1,800 to 10,000 killed.
 
According to Hawley, the Japanese garrison at Ulsan Castle numbered 10,000 men, with less than 1,000 surviving the siege. However, other sources put the original garrison force at 20,000 and 23,000.

Yang Hao would ultimately be called back to Beijing for his failure at Ulsan on 12 August 1598.

Citations

Bibliography

 
 
 
 
 
 
 
 
 
 
 桑田忠親 [Kuwata, Tadachika], ed., 舊參謀本部編纂, [Kyu Sanbo Honbu], 朝鮮の役 [Chousen no Eki]　(日本の戰史 [Nihon no Senshi] Vol. 5), 1965.
 
 
 
 
 
 
 
 
 
 
 
 
  
 
 
 
 
 
 

1597 in Asia
1598 in Asia
Conflicts in 1598
Ulsan
Ulsan
Ulsan